Roosevelt Boulevard, officially named the Theodore Roosevelt Memorial Boulevard and often referred to, chiefly by local Philadelphians, simply as "the Boulevard," is a major traffic artery through North and Northeast Philadelphia. The road begins at Interstate 76 (Schuylkill Expressway) in Fairmount Park, running as a freeway also known as the Roosevelt Boulevard Extension or the Roosevelt Expressway through North Philadelphia, then transitioning into a twelve-lane divided highway that forms the spine of Northeast Philadelphia to its end at the city line.

Today, Roosevelt Boulevard is designated as US 1. Portions are concurrent with US 13 (between Hunting Park Avenue and Robbins Street) and Pennsylvania Route 63 (between Red Lion and Woodhaven Roads).

The road is notorious for two intersections which have been designated the second and third most dangerous intersections in the country by State Farm Insurance, at Red Lion Road and Grant Avenue respectively. The dangerous reputation of the road led to installation of the first red light cameras in Philadelphia in 2004. The road has been the scene of numerous pedestrian casualties and studies are underway to allow pedestrian traffic to be separated from vehicular traffic.

Route description

Roosevelt Expressway

The Roosevelt Boulevard Extension, also known as the Roosevelt Expressway, begins at Interstate 76 (Schuylkill Expressway) in Fairmount Park adjacent to the Philadelphia city line, as an expressway also known as the Roosevelt Boulevard Expressway U.S. Route 1. It crosses the Schuylkill River via the Twin Bridges and runs eastward through the neighborhoods of East Falls and Hunting Park. The Roosevelt Expressway interchanges with Broad Street (Pennsylvania Route 611) and ends at an interchange with US 13 (Roosevelt Boulevard), at which point US 1 merges onto the Roosevelt Boulevard and continues northeast along with US 13.

Roosevelt Boulevard
The Roosevelt Boulevard begins at an intersection with Hunting Park Avenue, continuing northeast as a part of US 13. The road crosses Broad Street (PA 611) before US 1 (Roosevelt Expressway) merges in at an interchange and Roosevelt Boulevard becomes a 12-lane surface arterial with local and express lanes and at-grade intersections, carrying US 1 and US 13.

The road continues east through Hunting Park and Feltonville, where it curves and resumes running in a northeasterly direction. It meets Oxford Avenue (Pennsylvania Route 232) at a large traffic circle known as Oxford Circle (the express lanes pass through the circle via an underpass). The road carries northbound U.S. Route 13 one more mile until it splits off onto Robbins Street and Levick Street (both one-way streets). The road continues to a large interchange with Cottman Avenue (Pennsylvania Route 73) and the Roosevelt Mall. The traffic circle with Holme and Solly Avenues known as the Pennypack Circle was rebuilt in 2015 and no longer exists. There is access to both avenues from the local lanes, both north- and southbound. The boulevard continues past Pennypack Park and Northeast Philadelphia Airport, passing through two notoriously dangerous intersections with Grant Avenue and Red Lion Road.

The road continues northeast, interchanging with Woodhaven Road (Pennsylvania Route 63), then narrowing as it approaches its end at an intersection on the Philadelphia-Bucks County border. After two traffic light intersections in Trevose in Bensalem Township, U.S. 1 continues as a freeway to the north.

Public transportation

Several SEPTA City Bus routes operate along portions of Roosevelt Boulevard, with routes , and  following the boulevard for a significant distance. The Route 1 bus runs along the entire length of Roosevelt Boulevard as part of its route between 54th Street and City Avenue in West Philadelphia and Parx Casino and Racing in Bensalem. The Route 14 bus follows Roosevelt Boulevard north of Bustleton Avenue as part of its route between the Frankford Transportation Center to the south and the Neshaminy Mall and Oxford Valley Mall to the north. The Route R bus follows Roosevelt Boulevard south of Pratt Street as part of its route between the Wissahickon Transportation Center and the Frankford Transportation Center. The portion of Roosevelt Boulevard north of Bustleton Avenue is also served by the Boulevard Direct, a limited-stop bus route between the Frankford Transportation Center and the Neshaminy Mall. The Boulevard Direct offers improved travel times compared to traditional bus service along Route 14, with more frequent service and several bus stops located on the far side of intersections to improve performance.

Proposed Roosevelt Blvd Subway

The Roosevelt Boulevard Subway is a proposed SEPTA subway line that would run along Roosevelt Boulevard.  The route was first proposed in 1913 as part of the Broad Street Subway line from Adams Avenue. Its construction has been considered at a variety of points in Philadelphia's history. Last studied in detail in 2003, a plethora of alignments and construction options were considered; including within the median of a highway that would replace the Boulevard, an alternate route that would follow and replace the current Fox Chase Line of SEPTA Regional Rail, and an at grade route that would function similarly to the city's subway-surface network. A largely underground alignment under the Boulevard was chosen that would have left the current Broad Street Line at Erie, using an already extant flying junction with the express tracks. It would have then tunneled to Roosevelt Boulevard and been constructed cut and cover until Blue Grass road near the northern edge of Philadelphia. From there its would have been on an elevated structure until almost reaching the county line. Additionally a cut and cover extension of the Market-Frankford Line was to be constructed under Bustleton Avenue until intersecting with the Boulevard. Cost estimates ranged between $2.5 and $3.4 billion in year 2000 dollars. Largely dependent on if constructing all stations in open cuts, rather than strictly underground, was feasible. It was estimated to draw 124,523 daily boardings, approximately the current ridership of the Broad Street Line, and divert 83,300 daily automobile trips. The project however did not move forward due to lack of local financing.

In 2003, six engineering, consulting, and design firms submitted a study  to the Philadelphia City Planning Commission and SEPTA detailing the potential for rapid transit on Roosevelt Boulevard in Northeast Philadelphia. The Roosevelt Boulevard Corridor Study looked at multiple modes of rapid transit including light rail, bus rapid transit, and a heavy rail/subway line directly connected to the Broad Street Subway’s express tracks north of Erie Station. 

The study found a Broad Street Subway extension along Roosevelt Boulevard and a one-mile extension of the Market-Frankford Line from Frankford Transportation Center to a new underground interchange between the lines at Bustleton Avenue and Roosevelt Boulevard would take under a decade to complete. 

In a public meeting hosted by Pennsylvania Rep. Jared Solomon, representatives from SEPTA, PennDOT and the Philadelphia Office of Transportation and Infrastructure discussed the project, which has long been called for as a way to better connect Northeast Philadelphia to Center City and make one of the city's most dangerous roads safer. The idea for a subway along Roosevelt Boulevard dates back more than a century.

Ashwin Patel, a senior manager at PennDOT, said at the meeting that the agency would study what is feasible — whether it be a subway, an elevated rail line or more dedicated bus routes. That exploration would be done as an expansion of the city-administered Route for Change program for Roosevelt Boulevard, released in spring 2021.

History

Proposed in 1903 by Mayor Samuel H. Ashbridge as part of the City Beautiful movement, the 300-foot-wide thoroughfare originally extended from Broad Street to the Torresdale neighborhood, and was first named Torresdale Boulevard, then Northeast Boulevard in 1914 when the road was completed.  On its extension to Pennypack Creek in 1918, it was finally renamed to Roosevelt Boulevard, in honor of Theodore Roosevelt. The road was designated U.S. 1 in 1926, and was extended through Philadelphia to neighboring Bucks County in the post-World War II years.

The Roosevelt Expressway was built to connect the boulevard with the nearby Schuylkill Expressway (I-76).

In 1998 a series of gang-related criminal rock throwing attacks on cars driving near Ridge Avenue, Henry Avenue and Fox Street "terrorized" Philadelphia drivers.

In 2000, by act of the state legislature, the Boulevard was designated the "Police Officer Daniel Faulkner Memorial Highway" in memory of Daniel Faulkner, a Philadelphia police officer whom Mumia Abu-Jamal was convicted of having slain in the line of duty in 1981. The designation is alongside the roadway's official name of Roosevelt Boulevard.

There have been several plans to change the boulevard into an expressway-like artery, like the Roosevelt Expressway itself, and construct a subway underneath the boulevard, but no such plans have been acted upon.

Today, Roosevelt Boulevard is among the most congested arteries in the country.  According to a 2001 report by State Farm Insurance, the second- and third-worst intersections in the country are both found on the Boulevard, at Red Lion Road and Grant Avenue, respectively, only a mile apart from each other. Red light cameras have been installed at these intersections, as well as Cottman Avenue, and have been operational since June 1, 2005.  New cameras installed at the intersections with 9th Street, Mascher Street, Levick Street, Rhawn Street, Welsh Road, and Southampton Road became operational in summer 2007. Additional plans include adding cameras at Devereaux Avenue and Tyson Avenue. On June 1, 2020, speed cameras were activated along Roosevelt Boulevard, with a 60-day warning period before fines are issued.

Major intersections
The entire road is in Philadelphia, Philadelphia County.

See also

References

External links

Greater Philadelphia GeoHistory Network - historical maps and atlases of Philadelphia
Article on US-1 with history of Roosevelt Boulevard
Map of Dangerous Intersections in Philadelphia

Streets in Philadelphia
Boulevards in the United States
U.S. Route 1
U.S. Route 13
Lincoln Highway